Patrick Henry Nelson II (October 3, 1856 - June 20, 1914) was born in Camden, South Carolina to General Patrick Henry Nelson, of the Confederate States Army, and Emma Sarah Cantey. After attending The University of the South, Nelson went to study law with Judge Joseph B. Kershaw in Camden, S.C. in 1875.  In 1877 he was admitted to the bar and went to practice with General John D. Kennedy of Camden.  He then moved his practice to Columbia, South Carolina, and in 1885 he was elected to the South Carolina House of Representatives and served until 1887. Nelson became the Fifth Circuit Solicitor and the President of the South Carolina Bar Association (1911-1912). After the growth of his own firm, Nelson's son, William Shannon Nelson (1881-1939) joined the firm with his father. Ultimately William's son, Patrick Henry Nelson III (1910-1964), would come to run the law firm and continue its tremendous growth.

The Nelson Law Firm is now known as Nelson Mullins Riley & Scarborough LLP (commonly referred to as Nelson Mullins) which is a pseudo-national U.S. law firm and lobby group based in Columbia, South Carolina.

References

1856 births
1914 deaths
People from Camden, South Carolina
Members of the South Carolina House of Representatives
South Carolina lawyers
Sewanee: The University of the South alumni
19th-century American politicians
19th-century American lawyers
20th-century American lawyers